Joshua Tan Wei En (born 19 August 1990) is an Australian actor and singer based in Singapore.

Career
Tan has become a local celebrity after the successes of Ah Boys to Men movie series as Ken Chow by director Jack Neo.

Personal life 
Tan was born in Melbourne, Australia but was raised in Singapore. He has a degree from Melbourne's Monash University. He married Zoen Tay on 26 December 2022.

Filmography

Film

Television Series

Variety

Theater

Awards and nominations

References

External links
 
 

Living people
1990 births
Australian expatriates in Singapore
Australian male actors
Monash University alumni
Singaporean_people_of_Chinese_descent
Australian_people_of_Chinese_descent